Louisville Bible College is a private, co-educational college located in southeast Louisville, Kentucky, United States. It was founded in September 1948. LBC's mission is "to educate preachers and other Christian leaders for Christ's Church."

The college is authorized to grant degrees in the Commonwealth of Kentucky as a religious institution with a letter on file with the Council on Postsecondary Education.

Courses of study

Degrees
 Certificate of Christian Leadership 
 Associate of Sacred Literature
 Bachelor of Sacred Literature
 Master of Sacred Literature

All associate degree students major in Bible and select one of the following specialties:
 Ministry
 Christian Education

All bachelor's degree students major in Bible and:
 General Ministries

 degree students select one of the following:
 Bible (Focus: Old Testament or New Testament)
 Bible and Ministry
 Bible and Theology

Student life
LBC is primarily a commuter campus with student housing available for those beyond a commuting distance.

Students are encouraged to participate in campus life (such as cookouts with administration, faculty and staff) and to cultivate a network of Christian mentors and friends.

Chapel services are held and are considered to be an important part of Student Life. They are developed to meet students' spiritual formation needs.

Board of Regents
The Board of Regents is the governing body of the college. The board is responsible for hiring the President, setting policy, approving the budget, securing adequate funding/resources, and advancing the mission of the institution.

Presidents
The college has had seven presidents.
 Ira M. Boswell (1949–1950)
 Ralph L. Records (1950–1965)
 Frank W. Buck (1965–1971)
 Thomas R. Omer (1971–1990)
 Tommy W. Mobley, D.Min. (1990–2004; 2016–present)
 Charles A. McNeely, D.D. (2004–2009)
 Tracy W. Marx, D.Min. (2010–2015)
 Kerry Allen, A.A, B.A, MSL (2020-Present)

Campus facilities
The current campus is located at 8211 Restoration Drive in Louisville and consists of the following facilities.
 Ralph L. Records Hall 
 Ira M. Boswell Memorial Library 
 Chapel is available at LifeBridge Christian Church next to the campus

Notable students
 Pat Day – Inductee, National Museum of Racing and Hall of Fame

Gallery

See also
 Religion in Louisville, Kentucky

References

External links
 

Bible colleges
Educational institutions established in 1948
Universities and colleges in Louisville, Kentucky
1948 establishments in Kentucky
Christianity in Louisville, Kentucky